Persoonia scabra is a species of flowering plant in the family Proteaceae and is endemic to the south-west of Western Australia. It is an erect to spreading shrub with hairy young branchlets, narrow oblong to lance-shaped leaves, and yellow flowers arranged singly, in pairs or threes, with a scale leaf at the base.

Description

Taxonomy
Persoonia prostrata was first formally described in 1810 by Robert Brown in Transactions of the Linnean Society of London from specimens he collected at Lucky Bay.

Distribution and habitat
This geebung grows in open scrub mallee in the area between Frank Hann National Park, Mount Buraminya and Cape Le Grand in the south-west of Western Australia.

Conservation status
Persoonia scabra is classified as "Priority Three" by the Government of Western Australia Department of Parks and Wildlife meaning that it is poorly known and known from only a few locations but is not under imminent threat.

References

scabra
Flora of Western Australia
Proteales of Australia
Plants described in 1810
Taxa named by Robert Brown (botanist, born 1773)